Dio-Gare  is a village and rural commune in the Cercle of Kati in the Koulikoro Region of south-western Mali. The commune has an area of 180 km2 and contains 7 villages. At the time of the 2009 census the commune had a population of 8,161. The main village, Dio-Gare, is 20 km northwest of Kati, the chef-lieu of the cercle. The Dakar–Niger Railway passes through the village.

References

External links
.

Communes of Koulikoro Region